The 2013 FIFA Confederations Cup was the ninth FIFA Confederations Cup, which was held in Brazil from 15 to 30 June 2013 as a prelude to the 2014 FIFA World Cup. The most recent winners of the six continental championships appeared in the tournament, along with hosts Brazil and UEFA Euro 2012 runners-up Italy, who qualified because the Euro 2012 winners, Spain, had also won the most recent FIFA World Cup in 2010 thus securing a spot in the tournament.

Host nation, Brazil successfully defended their title with a 3–0 win over Spain in the final. It was their fourth Confederations Cup title and third in a row, after previous wins in 1997, 2005 and 2009.

According to then FIFA president Sepp Blatter, the 2013 FIFA Confederations Cup was the best version of the tournament ever played. The competition was the first national team tournament to employ goal-line technology, which was also used at the 2014 World Cup.

Qualified teams

Venues
Six stadiums were used, each in a different city.

Draw
The draw for the competition was held at the Palácio das Convenções in the Anhembi Convention Center in São Paulo, Brazil on 1 December 2012.

Teams from the same confederation were not drawn into the same group, therefore, one team each from UEFA and from CONMEBOL was drawn in each group. Brazil and Spain had automatically been assigned as A1 and B1 respectively, therefore, Italy and Uruguay were assigned respectively to Group A and Group B.

Match officials

Ten trios of officials were announced by FIFA on 13 May 2013.

Squads

Teams had to name a 23-man squad (three of whom must be goalkeepers) by the FIFA deadline of 3 June 2013. The squads were announced by FIFA on 7 June 2013.

Group stage

The competition's dates were confirmed by FIFA on 27 July 2011 in the build-up to the draw for the 2014 World Cup's preliminary qualification rounds. As the competition partially overlapped with the fourth round of the 2014 FIFA World Cup qualification in Asian zone, the Asian Football Confederation (AFC) asked FIFA to consider a change of date. However, the AFC decided that the match day would only be adjusted for the AFC representative at the Confederations Cup, Japan. The official final schedule was presented in Rio de Janeiro on 30 May 2012.

All times listed are Brasília official time (UTC−03:00).

All eight teams entered the group stage. The group winners and runners-up advanced to the semi-finals, while the bottom two teams in each group were eliminated from the tournament. The ranking of the teams in each group was determined as follows:
 Points obtained in all group matches;
 Goal difference in all group matches;
 Number of goals scored in all group matches;
If two or more teams were equal on the basis of the above three criteria, their rankings were determined as follows:
 Points obtained in the group matches between the teams concerned;
 Goal difference in the group matches between the teams concerned;
 Number of goals scored in the group matches between the teams concerned;
 Drawing of lots by the FIFA Organising Committee.

Group A

Group B

Knockout stage

In the knockout stage, if a match was level at the end of normal playing time, extra time would be played (two periods of 15 minutes each) and followed, if necessary, by a penalty shoot-out to determine the winner.

Bracket

Semi-finals

Third place play-off

Final

Awards

Statistics

Goalscorers
Fernando Torres was awarded the Golden Boot award on tie-breakers. Both he and Fred scored five goals and made one assist, but Torres was given the award due to having played fewer minutes over the tournament. In total, 68 goals were scored by 38 different players, with three of them credited as own goals.

5 goals

 Fred
 Fernando Torres

4 goals

 Neymar
 Abel Hernández

3 goals

 Javier Hernández
 Nnamdi Oduamadi
 David Villa
 Edinson Cavani
 Luis Suárez

2 goals

 Jô
 Paulinho
 Mario Balotelli
 Shinji Okazaki
 Jordi Alba
 David Silva

1 goal

 Dante
 Davide Astori
 Giorgio Chiellini
 Daniele De Rossi
 Alessandro Diamanti
 Emanuele Giaccherini
 Sebastian Giovinco
 Andrea Pirlo
 Keisuke Honda
 Shinji Kagawa
 Elderson Echiéjilé
 Mikel John Obi
 Juan Mata
 Pedro
 Roberto Soldado
 Jonathan Tehau
 Diego Forlán
 Nicolás Lodeiro
 Diego Lugano
 Diego Pérez

1 Own goal

 Atsuto Uchida (against Italy)
 Jonathan Tehau (against Nigeria)
 Nicolas Vallar (against Nigeria)

Source: FIFA

Tournament ranking

Match ballSee also Adidas Tango 12The official match ball for the Cup was produced by Adidas, a development of the Adidas Tango 12. It was unveiled during the draw for the competition. The ball is named "Cafusa" – a syllabic abbreviation of the words "" (Carnival), "" (football) and "samba", aside of being homophonous with '', the Portuguese name for a zamba i.e. a woman of mixed Amerindian and black African descent. Former Brazil captain Cafu was invited to officially unveil the ball.

Prize money
The competing national football associations received prize money from FIFA based on their representative team's final finishing position.

Goal-line technology
The 2013 FIFA Confederations Cup was the first international tournament for national teams to use goal-line technology. The IFAB officially approved the use of goal-line technology in July 2012, and it was first used in a FIFA competition for the 2012 FIFA Club World Cup in December 2012. Having trialled systems from both Hawk-Eye and GoalRef during the Club World Cup, FIFA announced on 2 April 2013 that the German technology GoalControl had been chosen as the official goal-line technology for the 2013 FIFA Confederations Cup. Its system, GoalControl-4D, uses 14 high-speed cameras located around the pitch and directed at both goals. It was used in the match for third place between Uruguay and Italy to determine the scorer of Italy's first goal.

Protests

Prior to the opening ceremony at the Brasilia National Stadium on 15 June, demonstrations took place outside the stadium, organised by people unhappy with the amount of public money spent to enable the hosting of the FIFA World Cup. Police used tear gas and pepper spray to quell the protests.

The demonstrations were part of wider unrest and rioting in Brazilian cities initially sparked by increased ticket prices on public transport, but growing to express deeper public disenchantment with the financial management of the country by its government, specially due to the high inflation. The Brazilian president Dilma Rousseff as well as FIFA president Sepp Blatter were heavily booed as they were announced to conduct their speeches at the tournament's opening. Further protests took place the following day prior to the game between Mexico and Italy in Rio de Janeiro. Blatter said that the protesters "should not use football to make their demands heard", and that the public expenditure on staging the tournaments was on "items that are for the future, not just for the World Cup".

As the protests continued to intensify during the week, with a reported participation of over a million people taking to the streets in a hundred different towns and cities, reports in the Brazilian media suggested that FIFA was having to negotiate with the teams to keep them in Brazil and that the tournament could be abandoned. However, a FIFA statement on 21 June insisted that "to date, neither FIFA nor the local organising committee have ever discussed any such possibility of cancelling the FIFA Confederations Cup".

FIFA General Secretary Jérôme Valcke subsequently admitted that FIFA had held a "crisis meeting" involving the Brazilian government regarding the completion of the tournament, but sought to distance FIFA from the wider social unrest, stating that "the most important thing for us is to detach the World Cup or the Confederations Cup from these problems. We are not the answer to all problems and we are definitely not the reason for such a crisis. We are just part of what Brazil is doing for the next 20 years....the light FIFA is being shown in here, is the wrong one". He also reaffirmed that the protests had not caused FIFA to consider moving the 2014 World Cup away from Brazil.

Just before the final in Rio de Janeiro, a large crowd marched towards the stadium both in support of the team and in continuation over the original protests. Though largely peaceful, there were some disturbances.

References

External links

FIFA Confederations Cup Brazil 2013 at FIFA.com
2013 FIFA Confederations Cup Official Site (Archived)
FIFA Technical Report

 
2013
2013 FIFA Confederations Cup
FIFA Confederations Cup
FIFA Confederations Cup
June 2013 sports events in South America